Tupelo High School is a high school located in Tupelo, Oklahoma, United States. It currently has 77 students and serves grades 9 to 12. Notable alumni include Charlie Hudson, a one-time major league baseball player.

References
Public School Review
The Baseball Cube

Public high schools in Oklahoma
Schools in Coal County, Oklahoma